The Moltrasio Formation also known as  the Lombardische Kieselkalk Formation is a geological formation in Italy. This Formation mostly developed in the Lower or Middle Sinemurian stage of the Lower Jurassic, where on the Lombardian basin tectonic activity modified the current marine and terrestrial habitats. Here it  developed a series of marine-related depositional settings, represented by an outcrop of 550–600 m of grey Calcarenites and Calcilutites with chert lenses and marly interbeds, that recovers the Sedrina, Moltrasio and Domaro Formations. This was mostly due to the post-Triassic crisis, that was linked locally to tectonics. The Moltrasio Formation is considered a continuation of the Sedrina Limestone and the Hettangian Albenza Formation, and was probably a shallow water succession, developed on the passive margin of the westernmost Southern Alps. It is known due to the exquisite preservation observed on the Outcrop in Osteno, where several kinds of marine biota have been recovered.

Fossils

Exceptional fossilization 
Apart from the Eocene of Monte Bolca, the Sinemurian of Osteno is the only fossil deposit in Italy in which soft bodies are preserved. The Osteno site was discovered in 1964. It was recovered from a series of  package of fine laminated, gray, spongiolitic, micritic limestone. Coroniceras bisulcatum allowed to date the outcrop as the Bucklandi zone, lower Sinemurian. The outcrop is a good documentation of a particularly complete fauna and flora of the Lower Jurassic which is not exactly common in the Southern Alps. The Osteno outcrop, part of the formation, is worldwide known due to the exceptional preservation of mostly marine biota, including rare fossilized components, helping to understand the ecosystems of the local Sinemurian margin of the Monte Generoso Basin. The high local variety of fossils found is most likely due to unique conditions of preservation, where phosphatized soft tissues have not been observed in any fish or polychaetes, but they are common in crustaceans (33%) and also occur in a smaller percentage of teuthids (14%). Soft part preservation through phosphatization in this deposit includes the muscles and branchia of Crustaceans, fish tissues, and the digestive tracts of coleoids, polychaetes, and nematodes. These fossils are interpreted as having been preserved in a stagnant, restricted basin with anoxic conditions likely within the sediment pore waters.

Nematoida

Annelida

Crustacea

Xiphosurida

Thylacocephala

Cephalopoda

Echinoderms

Hemichordata

Chondrichthyes

Actinopterygii

Sarcopterygii

Plants

See also 
 List of fossiliferous stratigraphic units in Italy
 Calcare di Sogno, Toarcian fossiliferous formation of Lombardy

References 

Geologic formations of Italy
Jurassic System of Europe
Early Jurassic Europe
Sinemurian Stage
Limestone formations
Paleontology in Italy
Geography of Lombardy